is a Japanese light novel series written by Reiji Saiga and illustrated by Sora Inoue. It was serialized in Dragon Magazine from 1997 to 2010. A manga adaptation by the same authors was serialized in Monthly Comic Dragon from 1998 to 2001. A 13-episode anime television series was produced by Gonzo in 2001. It is set in a school called Daimon High, where disagreements among the student body are settled by martial arts matches called K-Fights. (The "K" stands for kenka, meaning "street fight".)

Media

Light novels
The series in which both the manga, and the anime is based upon is the light novel series, written by Reiji Saiga. Original name is Shoukan Kyoushi Real bout High School (召喚教師リアルバウトハイスクール), and unlike the manga and anime, it centres around a teacher who works in Daimon high school. The main story line has 19 volumes, the EX line has 5 volumes, and the ED line has 3 volumes. However, the characters that appear in the novel are more or less identical to the manga and anime (with a few minor adjustments).

Manga
The story revolves around a school that doesn't break up fights, but rather, they grade them. The story introduces Ryoko Mitsurugi, Daimon High's Current reigning K-Fight Champion and self described Samurai Girl.  It also introduces Shizuma Kusunagi, a traveling Street Fighter with mysterious powers.
The manga, while comedic in the beginning, becomes more serious as Ryoko and Shizuma find themselves caught up in the machinations of several student councils and a criminal organization with Ryoko teaming up with a band of female fighters named after the historical
Shinsengumi.

Anime
Ryoko Mitsurugi is the current K-Fight champion, whose skill at Kendo and her love for samurai dramas has led her to be known as the "Samurai Girl". One day, Ryoko finds a strange pendant which transports her to another dimension called Solvania, where she is expected to fight monsters. This is part of a bigger plot to revive Solvania the strong.

Characters

A martial arts expert and Daimon High's current K-Fight champion. In Episode 1, it is revealed that Ryoko has an aunt named Madoka Mitsurugi. She seeks to learn the way of the sword, but is slightly self-conscious due to her height (she's  5'9" in the manga) and her samurai obsession. She is highly skilled in Kendo; only Tatsuya Shishikura, the captain of the kendo team, is able to beat her in formal kendo. Her rival is Azumi Kiribayashi, as she is a highly skilled fighter and is also in love with Tatsuya Shishikura. She also helps out the drama club with the school plays. In the manga her goals are different; she seeks to become a great woman by using the way of the sword and acts as a vigilante in the name of justice. Later on she becomes the leader of an all-female fighting group.

 A year ago, this young, tough ruffian was the K-Fight champion until Ryoko beat him. He has now returned for a rematch. he is a street fighter who practices kamui: a method that gives him fire-ki abilities. Besides his strength and use of flames, he had no martial arts training but uses self styled methods from years of street fighting with this combination of his own personal style and kamui no ken makes him one of the strongest martial artist in the school. Unlike Ryoko, he is not a member of any school club. So, in the manga, he created his own fan club. Although very cruel at times, he shows a soft spot towards Miyuki (the Hiten Shrine girl and Tessai's granddaughter), Sara (his personal fan), and sometimes even towards Ryoko, whom he admitted having romantic feelings for during their battle in volume 6 of the manga. Due to his family musical background, he is skilled with the guitar and piano he also rides a Motorcycle. In his childhood, he was taught kamui no ken by an old homeless-looking man named Ryugan Higishikata for everyday use. Shizuma turned it into a fighting technique. He was obviously modelled after Kyo Kusanagi and has his last name. In the manga, he is modeled after Donnie Yen. In volume 6 of the manga, he had nunchakus in his final fight with Ryoko.

Sara Himekawa
 
 Shizuma's friend with the blonde hair.

 Ryoko's best friend with the glasses. She supports Ryoko in times of need. Although she attends a school that has K-Fights, she does not have any martial arts abilities.

 Ryoko's number one fan. He is a bit of a stalker but helps her. He follows Ryoko around with either a camera or a camcorder.

 Azumi is a senior at Daimon High School and the head of the Flower Arrangement Club. Azumi likes to annoy Ryoko by being a rival for Tatsuya's affections. She uses a naginata as her primary weapon.

 Captain of the Kendo team. Ryoko and Azumi are fighting for his affections. He moves away in the middle of the manga (something that has not happened in the anime).

 Daimon High's principal, an avid supporter of the K-Fight system and in the anime, former teacher to Nagumo.

 Daimon High School's fast talking K-fight announcer.

Shinsengumi
In the manga, Ryoko teams up with a group of girls for some group fights.
 Megumi Momoi:  Highly skilled Mixed martial artist and Grappler.
 Xiaoxing Huang: Chinese martial artist.  Specializes in Binding. (Must Bind 300 opponents before she can return to her master)
 Asuka Kuronari: Specializes in Ninja Arts and Explosives. (While skilled in various ninja arts, she is only average in Martial arts skills)
 Aoi Asahina: Highly skilled martial artist and swordswoman. (Sword Skill could match or even exceed Ryoko)
 Midori Misato: Team Logistics and Communications Officer (Not a Fighter)

Introduced in the anime

 A girl who resides at the Hiten Shrine. She has a small appearance in the manga.

 Miyuki's grandfather and head of the Hiten Shrine. He teaches Ryoko the way of the sword, to be specific, the Hiten Style.  He suggests Ryoko to keep using the bokken as it is two weapons in one.

 (Anime Only) A mysterious fighter who created and championed the K-Fight system. Due to his travels overseas, he has fought against many martial artists. Like Shizuma, He possesses the fists of kamui. Only his technique, Shinken, uses energy based techniques. He is looking for the man who taught Shizuma. Later in the series, it is revealed that he and Willard Gates have had a long standing feud.

 (Anime Only) She is a war priestess that appears to Ryoko and the gang. She is from an alternate dimension called Solvania.

 She works for Willard Gates and has an interest in Ryoko's fighting.

 The antagonist in the series. He and Nagumo have been long-time rivals.

Movie adaptation attempt

In the early 2000s, Tokyopop had plans for a live-action version of Real Bout High School with Melissa Joan Hart.

Reception

Further reading
 Bynum, Aaron H., Manga Case Study: RBHS at Animefringe.com, a four-part in-depth essay (part two, part three, part four)

References

External links
 TOKYOPOP (Archived) English language manga publisher
 TOKYOPOP (Archived) English language anime publisher
 

1997 Japanese novels
1998 manga
2001 anime television series debuts
Fantasy anime and manga
Fujimi Fantasia Bunko
Fujimi Shobo manga
Kadokawa Dwango franchises
Gonzo (company)
Japanese television series with live action and animation
Light novels
Martial arts anime and manga
Samurai in anime and manga
School life in anime and manga
Shōnen manga
Tokyopop titles
Novels set in high schools and secondary schools